Paul Dunne is an Irish golfer.

Paul Dunne may also refer to:

Paul Dunne, who played for The Rock GAA
Paul Dunne, character played by Keith Duffy

See also
Paul Dunn (disambiguation)